Rooiwal Power Station is a 300-megawatt (MW) coal-fired power plant near Pretoria in Gauteng, South Africa.

Location 
A Google map at  shows the location of the plant north of Pretoria, in the Mont Lorraine area of Tshwane Municipality, Gauteng.

Background
Rooiwal Power Station is a five-unit coal-fired power plant with a total capacity of 300 MW. The plant was completed between 1962 and 1970, and is owned by Tshwane Electricity Division.

In April 2015 the City of Tshwane said it was seeking proposals to renovate two coal-fired power plants to their original design capacity: Pretoria West Power Station and Rooiwal Power Station. Both are operating considerably below their capacity partly because they have been designed to use anthracite, a grade of coal that is more profitable to export.

Plant Details 
Sponsor: Tshwane Electricity Division
Parent company: Tshwane Electricity Division
Location: Pretoria, Tshwane Municipality, Gauteng, South Africa
Coordinates: -25.5550101, 28.2375732 (exact)
Status: Operating
Gross capacity: 300 MW (Units 1-5: 60 MW)
Type: Subcritical
In service: 1962-70
Coal type: Anthracite
Coal source: coal
Source of financing:

References

Coal-fired power stations in South Africa
Economy of Gauteng
City of Tshwane Metropolitan Municipality